Christiane Baroche (born 20 January 1935 Paris) is a French novelist, and short story writer.

She graduated with a BS in 1954. 
After a scientific career, at the Curie Institute (Paris) she turned to writing.

Awards
1978 Prix Goncourt de la Nouvelle, Chambres, avec vue sur le passé
1994 Grand Prix SGDL de la Nouvelle

Works
Les Feux du large, nouvelles, Gallimard, 1975
Chambres, avec vue sur le passé, nouvelles, Gallimard, 1978
L’Ecorce indéchiffrable, poèmes, collection SUD, 1979
 Pas d’autres intempéries que la solitude, nouvelles, Gallimard, 1980
Perdre le souffle, nouvelles, Gallimard, 1983
Un soir, j’inventerai le soir, nouvelles, Actes Sud, 1983
L'Hiver de Beauté (Gallimard, 1987)
Et il ventait devant ma porte: nouvelles, Gallimard, 1989
Les Ports du silence (Grasset, 1992)
La Rage au bois dormant (Grasset, 1995)
Les petits bonheurs d'Héloïse (Grasset, 1997).
Ailleurs sous un ciel pâle, Le Castor astral, 1997, 
Attention chaud devant: nouvelles,  Transbordeurs, 2007,

References

External links
https://web.archive.org/web/20081121094310/http://www.edition-grasset.fr/chapitres/ch_baroche.htm
Reading Identities with Kristeva and Cixous

20th-century French novelists
20th-century French women writers
21st-century French novelists
Prix Goncourt de la nouvelle recipients
1935 births
Writers from Paris
Living people
21st-century French women writers
French women novelists
French women short story writers
20th-century French short story writers
21st-century French short story writers